David Chan-oong Kang (born January 17, 1965) is a Korean American political scientist.

Born to a family of Sincheon Kang clan, he holds a bachelor's degree in Anthropology and International Politics from Stanford University from 1988 and a doctorate in Political Science from the University of California, Berkeley, 1995. Since 2009, Kang has been a professor of the University of Southern California, where he is a professor in both international politics and organization and management. He leads the Institute for Korean Studies at the same university. Kang has previously been a professor at Dartmouth College and guest professor at Stanford University, Yale University, Seoul National University, Korea University and Université de Genève.

Research 
In his publication of They Think They’re Normal : Enduring Questions and New Research on North Korea - A Review Essay, David C. Kang talks about North Korea’s foreign and domestic policy, North Korea’s behavioral motivation, and lastly, to what extent North Korea’s behavior predictable or not. He uses three scholarly works of Patrick McEachern, Stephan Haggard and Marcus Noland, and Suk-Young Kim to fundamentally understand North Korea’s way of survival as a communist regime and their future endeavors.

Literature 

 Huang, Chin-hao; Kang, David C. (2022). State Formation through Emulation: The East Asian Model. Cambridge University Press. 
 Kang, David C. (2017) American Grand Strategy and East Asian Security in the Twenty-First Century. Cambridge University Press. 
 Kang, David C. (2010). East Asia Before the West: Five Centuries of Trade and Tribute. Columbia University Press.
 Sung Chull Kim; Kang, David C. (2009). Engagement with North Korea: A Viable Alternative. SUNY Press. 
 Kang, David C. (2007). China Rising: Peace, Power, and Order in East Asia. Columbia University Press. 
 Kang, David C.; Cha, Victor (2003). Nuclear North Korea: A Debate on Engagement Strategies. Columbia University Press.
 Kang, David C. (2002). Crony Capitalism: Corruption and Development in South Korea and the Philippines. Cambridge University Press.
Kang , David C. (2011). They Think They’Re Normal: Enduring Questions and New Research on North Korea - A Review Essay . International Security , vol. 36, no. 3, 2011, pp. 142–171.

See also 
 2018 North Korea–United States summit
 April 2018 inter-Korean summit
 May 2018 inter-Korean summit

References

1965 births
Living people
Experts on North Korea
American political scientists
American people of Korean descent
American international relations scholars
Stanford University alumni
University of California, Berkeley alumni
University of Southern California faculty
Dartmouth College faculty
David C.
American foreign policy writers
American male non-fiction writers